Fleurey-sur-Ouche (literally Fleurey on Ouche) is a commune in the Côte-d'Or department in eastern France.

Population

See also
Communes of the Côte-d'Or department

References

External links

 Official Fleury-sur-Ouche website (in French)

Communes of Côte-d'Or